Mikhail Romanovich Perlman (also Perelman; ; 21 March 1923 - 8 August 2002) was a former Soviet gymnast.

Perlman was born in Moscow, Russia and was Jewish.

Olympics
Perlman won a gold medal in the men's team in gymnastics at the 1952 Olympics in Helsinki for the USSR. He also took fourth place in the men's pommel horse.

See also
 List of select Jewish gymnasts

References

1923 births
Soviet male artistic gymnasts
Russian male artistic gymnasts
Olympic gold medalists for the Soviet Union
Olympic gymnasts of the Soviet Union
Gymnasts at the 1952 Summer Olympics
Olympic medalists in gymnastics
Jewish gymnasts
Russian Jews
Gymnasts from Moscow
People from Moscow Governorate
2002 deaths
Medalists at the 1952 Summer Olympics